Elizabeth Ammon is a London-based cricket journalist and broadcaster.

Ammon has written for The Guardian, The Independent, The Daily Mirror and The Times as well as for websites such as Sporting Intelligence ESPN and magazines such as The Cricket Monthly and Wisden Cricket Monthly.

Ammon has appeared on Sky Sports programme ‘Cricket Writers on TV’. Ammon has appeared as a pundit on TalkSport programme ‘Cricket Week’, Lord's podcast, and Off The Ball. Ammon has worked as a county cricket commentator for BBC Sport, as well as appearing on Test Match Special and BBC Radio Five Live.

References

British sports journalists
Year of birth missing (living people)
Living people
Cricket historians and writers